Lowder is a surname. Notable people with the surname include:

Arthur Lowder, English footballer
Bobby Lowder, American banking executive
Charles Lowder (1820–1880), English Anglican priest
Caroline Lowder Downing (alive in 1912), British suffragette, sister of Edith Downing
James Lowder, American writer
John Lowder, English architect and surveyor
Kyle Lowder, American actor